The 1935 Cal Aggies football team represented the Northern Branch of the College of Agriculture—now known as the University of California, Davis—as a member of the Far Western Conference (FWC) during the 1935 college football season. Led by eighth-year head coach Crip Toomey, the Aggies compiled an overall record of 2–6–1 with a mark of 1–3 in conference play, placing fourth in the FWC. The team was outscored by its opponents 199 to 47 for the season. The Aggies were shut out four times and in only one game did they score more than a touchdown. The Cal Aggies played home games at A Street field on campus in Davis, California.

Schedule

Notes

References

Cal Aggies
UC Davis Aggies football seasons
Cal Aggies football